Possessed may refer to:

Possession
 Possession (disambiguation), having some degree of control over something else
 Spirit possession, whereby gods, demons, animas, or other disincarnate entities may temporarily take control of a human body
 Demonic possession, spirit possession by a malevolent entity

Film and television 
 Possessed (1931 film), a 1931 drama starring Clark Gable and Joan Crawford
 Possessed (1947 film), a 1947 film noir starring Joan Crawford
 The Possessed (1965 film), a 1965 Italian mystery film 
 La Endemoniada (The Possessed) a 1974 Spanish horror film directed by Amando de Ossorio, a.k.a. Demon Witch Child
 The Possessed (1977 film), a 1977 American horror film directed by Jerry Thorpe
 Junoon (1978 film), aka Possessed, 1978 Indian epic
 Possessed (1983 film), a 1983 Hong Kong horror film
 Possessed II, a 1984 Hong Kong horror film
 The Possessed (1988 film), a 1988 French film
 Possessed (2000 film), a 2000 TV-movie starring Timothy Dalton
 Possessed (2006 film), a 2006 Malaysian horror film 
 The Possessed (2009 film), a 2009 American horror film based on a true story
 Living Death (film), a 2009 South Korean horror film also known as Possessed
 Soul (South Korean TV series), a 2009 South Korean TV series also known as Possessed
 Possessed (TV series), a 2019 South Korean TV series
 The Possessed (2021 film)

Literature 
 "The Possessed" (short story), a 1951 short story by Arthur C. Clarke
 Demons (Dostoevsky novel), an 1872 novel by Fyodor Dostoyevsky sometimes also called The Possessed
 The Possessed (play), a 1959 play by Albert Camus, adapted from Dostoyevsky's novel
 The Possessed: Adventures with Russian Books and the People Who Read Them (2010), a book by Elif Batuman named after Dostoevsky's novel
 Possessed (novel), a 1939 novel by Witold Gombrowicz

Music 
 Possessed (band), American death metal band
 Possessed (Gojira album)
 Possessed (Venom album)

Other uses
 The Possessed (comics), 2003
 Possessed (roller coaster), a Steel Impulse Coaster at Dorney Park formerly referred to as Voodoo

See also
 Repossessed (film), a parody/spoof film from 1991 starring Leslie Nielsen
 Repossession, a financial institution taking back property
 The Dispossessed, a 1974 utopian science fiction novel by Ursula K